Helvacı is a village in the District of Karataş, Adana Province, Turkey.

References

Villages in Karataş District